Milan Cabrnoch (born 6 August 1962 in Čáslav) is a Czech physician and politician. He was a Member of the European Parliament with the Civic Democratic Party, part of the European Conservatives and Reformists and sat on the European Parliament's Committee on Employment and Social Affairs.

He was a substitute for the Committee on Budgetary Control and a member of the Delegation to the EU-Russia Parliamentary Cooperation Committee.

Education
 1986: Doctor of Medicine (Faculty of Paediatrics, Charles University, Prague)

Career
 1986–1994: Doctor
 1994–1998: Head of department at the Ministry of Health
 1998: Deputy Minister of Health
 since 1995: Member of ODS (Civic Democratic Party)
 2000–2004: Member of the ODS executive council
 1998–2004: Member of Kolín Town Council
 1998–2004: Member of the Chamber of Deputies of the Parliament of the Czech Republic and Vice-Chairman of the Chamber's Committee for Social Policy and Health
 Member of the Permanent Delegation of the Parliament of the Czech Republic to the Council of Europe

See also
 2004 European Parliament election in the Czech Republic

External links
 
 

1962 births
Living people
Civic Democratic Party (Czech Republic) MEPs
MEPs for the Czech Republic 2004–2009
MEPs for the Czech Republic 2009–2014
Articles containing video clips
People from Čáslav
Charles University alumni